Kalimullino (Kälimulla) is a rural locality (a village) in Novochebenkinsky Selsoviet, Zianchurinsky District, Bashkortostan, Russia. The population was 74 as of 2010. There is 1 street.

Geography 
Kalimullino is located 27 km west of Isyangulovo (the district's administrative centre) by road. Novye Chebenki is the nearest rural locality.

References 

Rural localities in Zianchurinsky District